Eli Whitney Debevoise II (born February 8, 1953) is the former U.S. Executive Director of the World Bank Group his tenure was from April 6, 2007, to 2009.  He is also a partner at Arnold & Porter LLP and served as Commissioner of the Maryland Port Commission in Baltimore.  

President George W. Bush nominated Debevoise to be U.S. Executive Director of the World Bank Group on February 16, 2007, to fill the vacancy left by Robert Holland and acting Executive Director Jennifer Dorn. On November 16, 2009, it was announced that he would be replaced by Ian Hoddy Solomon after his term was finished.

Background
Eli Whitney Debevoise II, commonly known as “Whitney Debevoise,” was born in Morristown, New Jersey, in 1953, the son of Thomas M. Debevoise and Ann Taylor Debevoise. He graduated from the St. Albans School in Washington, D.C. in 1970. He graduated summa cum laude in 1974 from Yale University (where he was a member of Manuscript Society), with departmental honors in History and Latin American Studies, and received a J.D. from Harvard Law School in 1977. Debevoise is a member of the Council on Foreign Relations, the American Society of International Law, the International Law Section of the American Bar Association, and the International Bar Association. He speaks Portuguese, Spanish, and French fluently, and holds an honorary law degree from Vermont Law School.
He is the great, great grandson of Eli Whitney.

Career

Judicial clerkship
After graduating from Harvard Law School, Debevoise clerked for the Hon. William J. Holloway, Jr., of the United States Court of Appeals for the Tenth Circuit in 1978 through 1979.

Private practice 
Debevoise started at Arnold & Porter, LLP as an associate in 1979 and practiced as a partner from 1986 to 2007. During this time, he increasingly specialized in international financial transactions, banking and international trade. While in private practice, Whitney Debevoise represented the central banks and finance ministries of many countries, as well as the Bank for International Settlements, the World Bank, the African Development Bank and the Inter-American Development Bank. Debevoise has been involved in transactions ranging from Brazil's $49 billion Brady Plan exercise to numerous Yankee bond, Samurai bond, and Eurobond issuances in ten different currencies. He was involved with billion dollar equity placements of shares in firms, such as Telfonica Argentina, Companhia Vale do Rio Doce (CVRD), Petroleo Brasileiro SA (Petrobras), and Unibanco-Uniao de Bancos Brasileiros. For his efforts, Brazil awarded  Debevoise the Order of Rio Branco in 1997, which recognizes Brazilian and "foreign individuals" who have significantly contributed to the promotion of Brazil's international relations.

Debevoise also handled cases in the General Agreement on Tariffs and Trade (GATT) and World Trade Organization dispute settlement mechanism and at the International Centre for Settlement of Investment Disputes, including cases establishing rulings on the allocation of arbitral expenses and attorney's fees.

World Bank Group
Eli Whitney Debevoise was U.S. Executive Director of the World Bank Group from April 6, 2007, to October 2009. He represented the United States on a 24-member board representing 186 member countries that considers all loans, investments, country assistance strategies, budgets, audits and business plans of the World Bank Group entities. Borrowers include more than 125 countries and 300 companies and funds.

References

1953 births
Yale University alumni
Harvard Law School alumni
World Bank people
Living people
Arnold & Porter people
St. Albans School (Washington, D.C.) alumni
American officials of the United Nations
People from Morristown, New Jersey